Hubert Nyssen (born 11 April 1925 – 12 November 2011) was a Belgian-French writer, publisher and founder of the Éditions Actes Sud.

Biography 
Hubert Nyssen grew up in Boitsfort (today a commune in Brussels) and settled in Provence in 1968. He became a naturalised French citizen in 1976. A novelist, diarist, essayist and poet, he was the author of numerous books.

During his childhood in Brussels, under the German occupation, he was influenced by his grandfather who gave him a taste for intellectual culture. After his university studies at the Free University of Brussels, he founded an advertising company which became one of the most prosperous in Belgium. At the same time, he ran his own cultural center in Brussels, spoke on the radio and published his first literary works. In 1978, breaking up with his past as a French businessman, he founded in Arles the éditions Actes Sud with the help of his wife Christine Le Bœuf, a descendant of a rich family of Belgian businessmen, Henry Le Bœuf and Albert Thys. In this new life, his dispositions for business and his literary talents were soon to bear fruit, whereas at the time, setting up a publishing house in the south of France constituted an unprecedented audacity, all large French publishing houses being Parisian. It was a challenge and a real "cultural exception". Among his many editorial successes, he made known the American author Paul Auster in French translation and published in French the Swedish thriller trilogy Millennium.

But he was also a talented author and published more than forty works in the fields of novel, theater, poetry and essays.

Doctor of Arts, he taught at the  University of Provence and University of Liège. The University of Liège, which hosts its archives, the Nyssen Fund, appointed him Doctor honoris causa in 2003.

On his death, the Argentinian writer Alberto Manguel paid tribute to him:

Works

Work and short stories 
1973: Le Nom de l'arbre, Éditions Grasset, Passé-Présent n° 53, Babel n° 435.
1979: La Mer traversée, Grasset, Prix Méridien.
1982: Des arbres dans la tête, Grasset, Grand Prix du roman de la Société des gens de lettres.
1983: Éléonore à Dresde, Actes Sud, Prix Valery-Larbaud, Prix Franz-Hellens. Babel n° 14.
1995: Les Rois borgnes, Grasset, Prix de l'Académie française.  n° 2770.
1989: Les Ruines de Rome, Grasset,  Babel n° 134.
1991: Les Belles Infidèles, Actes Sud (Polar Sud)
1992: La Femme du botaniste, Actes Sud, Babel n° 317.
1995: L'Italienne au rucher, Éditions Gallimard. Babel n° 664 under the title La leçon d'apiculture,  2004
1998: Le Bonheur de l'imposture, Actes Sud
2000: Quand tu seras à Proust la guerre sera finie, Actes Sud
2002: Zeg ou les Infortunes de la fiction, Actes Sud
2004: Pavanes et Javas sur la tombe d'un professeur, Actes Sud
2008: Les Déchirements, Actes Sud
2009: L'Helpe mineure, Actes Sud
2012: Dits et Inédits, Actes Sud

Essays 
1969: Les Voies de l'écriture, Mercure de France, 1969.
1972: L'Algérie, Arthaud, 1972.
1981: Lecture d'Albert Cohen, Actes Sud
 L'Éditeur et son double, Actes sud, Vol. I : 1988 ; vol II : 1990 ; vol. III : 1996.
1993: Du texte au livre, les avatars du sens, Nathan
1997: Éloge de la lecture, Les Grandes Conférences, Fides
2002: Un Alechinsky peut en cacher un autre, Actes Sud
2002: Variations sur les variations, Actes Sud
2002: Sur les quatre claviers de mon petit orgue : lire, écrire, découvrir, éditer, Leméac / Actes Sud
2004: Lira bien qui lira le dernier : lettre libertine sur la lecture, Labor / Espace de libertés. Babel n°705.
2006: La Sagesse de l'éditeur, L'Œil neuf éditions
2006: Neuf causeries promenades, Leméac / Actes Sud
2007: Le mistral est dans l'escalier, journal de l'année 2006, Leméac / Actes Sud
2008: L'Année des déchirements, journal de l'année 2007, Leméac / Actes Sud
2009: Ce que me disent les choses, journal de l'année 2008, Leméac / Actes Sud
2010: À l'ombre de mes propos, journal de l'année 2009, Actes Sud

Poems 
1967: Préhistoire des estuaires, André de Rache
1973: La Mémoire sous les mots, Grasset
1977: Stèles pour soixante-treize petites mères, Saint-Germain-des-Près
1982: De l'altérité des cimes en temps de crise, l'Aire
1991: Anthologie personnelle, Actes Sud
 Eros in trutina, Leméac / Actes Sud

Opera and theatre 
2000: Mille ans sont comme un jour dans le ciel, Actes Sud
2006: Le Monologue de la concubine, Actes Sud
2008: L'Enterrement de Mozart + CD, Actes Sud / Musicatreize

Youth 
1996: L'Étrange Guerre des fourmis, Actes Sud Junior
1996: Le Boa cantor, Actes Sud Junior, 1996. Version + CD, 2003.
1999: Un point c'est tout, Actes Sud Junior
 L'Histoire du papillon qui faillit bien être épinglé + CD, Actes Sud Junior, 2002

Studies on the work and the editorial activity 
2006: Pascal Durand (dir.), L'Écrivain et son double : Hubert Nyssen, Liège/Arles, CELIC, Actes Sud
2012: Jacques De Decker, Le Dossier Hubert Nyssen, Brussels, Le Cri/Académie royale de langue et de littérature françaises
2013: Benoît Denis and Pascal Durand, « Postface, Éléments biographiques et Repères bibliographiques », in Hubert Nyssen, Le Nom de l'arbre, Brussels, Communauté française de Belgique, coll. Espace Nord, n° 316

Distinctions and tributes 
 Member of the Académie royale de langue et de littérature françaises de Belgique (elected 14 November 1998, at seat 33.)
 Docteur honoris causa of the University of Liège (2003)
 Officier de la Légion d'honneur (2005)
 Chevalier de l'ordre du Mérite wallon (2011)

References

External links 
 Site officiel
 Archives d'Hubert Nyssen à l'université de Liège
 [http://bibliobs.nouvelobs.com/actualites/20080221.BIB0853/les-nyssen-tel-pere-telle-fille.html 'Les Nyssen : tel père, telle fille] on Bibliobs
 Hubert Nyssen on Actes Sud
 Hubert Nyssen on Arllfb.be
 Hubert Nyssen, fondateur des éditions Actes Sud, est mort on Le Monde (14 November 2011)
 Françoise Nyssen, éditrice bienveillante on La Croix (10 October 2014)
 Hubert Nyssen on Babelio
  L'éditeur Hubert Nyssen est mort on Libération''

20th-century French poets
Belgian writers in French
20th-century French essayists
21st-century French essayists
Prix Valery Larbaud winners
20th-century Belgian poets
French publishers (people)
Academic staff of the University of Provence
Free University of Brussels (1834–1969) alumni
Members of the Académie royale de langue et de littérature françaises de Belgique
Officiers of the Légion d'honneur
1925 births
Writers from Brussels
2011 deaths